Anoraliuirsoq is an uninhabited island of Greenland. The island has an area of 200 km ² and has a shoreline of 115.5 kilometres.

See also
List of islands of Greenland

References

Uninhabited islands of Greenland
Cape Farewell Archipelago